Kuttur Mallappa was the lone Home Minister of Coorg State from 1952 to 1956. He was a Legislator for Shanivarsanthe of Coorg (Kodagu) from 1952–1957 and for Mercara from 1957 till his death in 1966.

References

See also
Government of Coorg
C M Poonacha
1952 Coorg Legislative Assembly election
Coorg Legislative Assembly

Year of birth missing
1966 deaths
Place of death missing
Indian independence activists from Karnataka
Kodava people
People from Kodagu district
Indian National Congress politicians from Karnataka
Coorg State politicians
Coorg State MLAs 1952–1956
Mysore MLAs 1957–1962
Mysore MLAs 1962–1967